Paul Melo e Castro is a British scholar and academic, known for his work on editing and translating particularly Indo-Portuguese literature. His area of work is Lusophone literature, film and visual culture.

Books
Dr. Castro has translated and edited two book-length works, Lengthening Shadows: An Anthology of Goan Short Stories translated from the Portuguese (Volume I and II). He is also the author of Shades of Grey: 1960s Lisbon in Novel, Film and Photography. (London: MHRA Texts and Dissertations, 2011.)
In 2016, he and Prof Helder Garmes of the University of São Paulo in Brazil collaborated to edit an
undiscovered novel by the late Epitacio Pais, of Batim (Goa), called Preia Mar (High Tide).

Other writing
He has also contributed many book chapters and journal articles. His work has gained noticed due to his translations of often-forgotten Goan short stories written decades ago in the Portuguese language, which is not much used in Goa, the former capital of the Portuguese Empire in the East today.

He is known to maintain the  Archive of Goan Writing in Portuguese blog.

Background
A profile of the academic-author says Castro was born in west London, but his father was a descendente (Goan-born of ethnic Portuguese extraction) who left Goa as a "young boy" in 1961, when Portuguese rule ended. Castro heard stories of Goa recounted by family members.
Professionally, he is a lecturer in the Portuguese language at the School of Languages, Cultures and Societies of the University of Leeds.

References

External links
Web page at the University of Leeds
In Search of the Story (Navhind Times)
The Times of Paul de (sic) Melo e Castro (The Goan)
[Goanet] Has Goan Writing in Portuguese been sufficiently studied or got adequately noticed? Not at all...

Living people
Academics of the University of Leeds
British people of Goan descent
British translators
Year of birth missing (living people)